Redessan (Provençal: Redeçan) is a commune in the Gard department in southern France.

Population

See also
Communes of the Gard department
 Costières de Nîmes AOC

References

Communes of Gard